Claiborne Farm is a thoroughbred horse breeding operation near Paris, Kentucky. It was established in 1910 by Arthur B. Hancock, owner of Ellerslie Stud in Albemarle County, Virginia, and has been operated by members of his family ever since.

Owners
 Arthur B. Hancock (1875–1957)
 Arthur B. "Bull" Hancock, Jr. (1910–1972)
 Seth W. Hancock (b. 1949)

Arthur B. Hancock III (b. 1943) owns Stone Farm, a breeding operation nearby.

Arthur B. Hancock imported breeding stock from Europe that made Claiborne Farm an international leader in breeding, sales, and racing. He bred Vigil, the 1923 Preakness Stakes winner. Among his famous sires was Sir Gallahad, purchased from France, who was the leading sire in 1930, 1933, 1934, and 1940 and who sired 1930 U.S. Triple Crown winner Gallant Fox. Claiborne Farm was part of a 1936 consortium that imported Blenheim from England and in 1944 purchased Princequillo, who became the leading U.S. sire for 1957 and 1958.

Claiborne Farm won the Eclipse Award for Outstanding Breeder in 1979 and again in 1984. It has been visited twice by Queen Elizabeth II of the United Kingdom, who owned racehorses herself. The farm was home to all the major horses owned by the Phipps family, including Orb, the 2013 Kentucky Derby winner. Secretariat was syndicated by Seth Hancock for breeding purposes and stood at stud at Claiborne Farm from the conclusion of his racing career at the end of 1973 until his death in 1989.

Racing historian Edward L. Bowen considers Claiborne Farm one of the most influential American breeding operations, due to the many breeders who benefited from its horses and the length of time that influence has lasted.

In 1973 the Keeneland Association honored Claiborne Farm with its Mark of Distinction for their contribution to Keeneland and the Thoroughbred industry.

Cemetery

Some of the horses buried at Claiborne Farm are:

 Ambiorix (1946–1975) – Leading sire 1961
 Blenheim (1927–1958)
 Bold Ruler (1954–1971), Leading sire 1963, 1964, 1965, 1966, 1967. 1968, 1969, 1973
 Buckpasser (1963–1978)
 Double Jay (1944–1972)
 Gallant Fox (1927–1954)
 Gamely (1964–1975)
 Hoist The Flag (1968–1980)
 Johnstown (1936–1950)
 Mr. Prospector (1970–1999), Leading sire 1987, 1988
 Nasrullah (1940–1959), Leading sire 1955, 1956, 1959, 1960, 1962
 Nijinsky II (1967–1992)
 Princequillo (1940–1964), Leading sire 1957, 1958
 Pulpit (1994–2012)
 Riva Ridge (1969–1985)
 Round Table (1954–1987), Leading sire 1972
 Secretariat (1970–1989)
 Swale (1981–1984)
 War Cloud (1915–1923)

Some of the horses buried at Claiborne's Marchmont Farm division:

 Ack Ack (1966–1990)
 Chatterton (1919–1933), Leading sire 1932
 Forli (1963–1988)
 Christmas Past (1979–2008), American Champion Three-Year-Old Filly (1982)
 Conquistador Cielo (1979–2002)
 Damascus (1964–1995)
 Danzig (1977–2006),  Leading sire (1991, 1992, 1993)
 Easy Goer (1986–1994)
 Moccasin (1963–1986)
 Sir Gallahad III (1920–1949), Leading sire 1930, 1933, 1934, 1940
 Sir Ivor (1965–1995)
 Tom Rolfe (1962–1989)
 Unbridled (1987–2001)

Stallions

Stallions standing at Claiborne Farm as of the 2023 breeding season include:

Blame: A son of Arch who famously won the 2010 Breeders' Cup Classic over Zenyatta, as well as winning an Eclipse Award. He commands a stud fee of $25,000.
Catholic Boy: A son of More Than Ready who won the Travers Stakes in 2018, he commands a fee of $25,000.
Demarchelier: Won his first 3 races including Gr.III Pennine Ridge Stakes. He commands a stud fee of $5,000.
First Samurai: A multiple Gr.I winning juvenile son of Giant's Causeway, he commands a stud fee of $7,500.
Lea: A son of Fist Samurai and grandson of champion sire Galileo, the Gr.I winner commands a stud fee of $5,000.
Mastery: A son of Candy Ride, won four of four races, including 3 stakes races of which one was the Gr.I Los Alamitos Futurity. He commands a stud fee of $7,500.
Runhappy: The son of Super Saver, Eclipse Champion sprinter and Horse of the Year finalist commands a stud fee of $15,000. 
Silver State: The Gr.I winning son of champion sire Hard Spun commands a stud fee of $20,000.
War Front: The world's top sire of turf juveniles and son of Danzig, he commands the highest stud fee at Claiborne Farm- $100,000.
War Of Will: Son of War Front, winner of two Gr.I's including The Preakness Stakes in 2019, commands a stud fee of $25,00.

References
Notes

Further reading

External links
 

American racehorse owners and breeders
Buildings and structures in Bourbon County, Kentucky
Eclipse Award winners
Breeders of Kentucky Derby winners
Breeders of Preakness Stakes winners
Breeders of Belmont Stakes winners
Owners of Kentucky Derby winners
Owners of Preakness Stakes winners
Owners of Belmont Stakes winners
Hancock family
Horse farms in Kentucky
1910 establishments in Kentucky